DXOC (1494 AM) Radyo Pilipino is a radio station owned and operated by Radyo Pilipino Media Group through its licensee Radio Audience Developers Integrated Organization (RADIO), Inc. The station's studio is located at Purok 3, Brgy. Manabay, Ozamiz. DXOC is one of the few stations of RadioCorp affiliated with Radio Mindanao Network.

History
DXOC is the pioneer station in Ozamiz, established in 1959 by Filipinas Broadcasting Network. In 1962, from its old location at the import-export compound in the middle of the rice field of Batjak, Inc. owned by Mr. & Mrs. Narciso Lim along Bernard St., the station transferred to its present location in Manabay, about 500 meters away from the Ozamiz City Hall. In 1983, DXOC was acquired by RADIO, Inc., a subsidiary of RadioCorp.

References

Radio stations in Misamis Occidental
News and talk radio stations in the Philippines
Radio stations established in 1959